St. Mary Catholic Church is a Catholic parish in the city of Mt. Angel, Oregon, United States in Marion County. It was originally established to serve German immigrants who began arriving in this area of the northern Willamette Valley in 1867. Mathias Butsch became the Catholic community's leader and founder. The parish church, built in 1912, was listed on the U.S. National Register of Historic Places in 1976. The church contains 18 original stained-glass windows.

References

External links

St. Mary Parish (official website)
Organ music at St. Mary Parish Church, Mt. Angel

German-American history
German-American culture in Oregon
Roman Catholic Archdiocese of Portland in Oregon
Roman Catholic churches in Oregon
Mt. Angel, Oregon
National Register of Historic Places in Marion County, Oregon
Churches on the National Register of Historic Places in Oregon
Churches in Marion County, Oregon
Tourist attractions in Marion County, Oregon
1881 establishments in Oregon
Religious organizations established in 1881
Roman Catholic churches completed in 1912
20th-century Roman Catholic church buildings in the United States